Ahu (also Romanized as Āhū) is a village in Garakan Rural District, in the Central District of Ashtian County, Markazi Province, Iran. At the 2006 census, its population was 374, in 113 families.

References 

Populated places in Ashtian County